The Women's Individual Road Race at the 1998 UCI Road World Championships was held on Saturday October 10, 1998, in Valkenburg, Netherlands, over a total distance of 103.2 kilometres (6 x 17.2 km laps). There were a total of 121 starters, with 95 cyclists finishing the race.

Final classification

References 
 Results

Women's Road Race
UCI Road World Championships – Women's road race
UCI